Shibalidian station is a subway station on Line 17 of the Beijing Subway. The station opened on December 31, 2021.

Platform Layout
The station has 2 underground island platforms with a track in the middle.

Exits
There are 3 exits, lettered A, C and D. Exits A and C are accessible via elevators.

Gallery

References

Beijing Subway stations in Chaoyang District
Railway stations in China opened in 2021